Köf may refer to one of a series of small German locomotives or Kleinlokomotiven including:

DRG Kleinlokomotive Class I - strictly speaking these were Kö, not Köf locomotives as they did not have hydraulic transmission.
DRG Kleinlokomotive Class II (although, not all of this class were Köf locomotives)
DB Class Köf III
 Other small locomotive classes including some of the Heeresfeldbahnlokomotiven
 Kof, the Hebrew word for monkey